Lekoni may refer to:
 Lékoni, Gabon, a town in Haut-Ogooué Province
 Lekoni River
 Lekoni Park
 Lékoni Airport (List of airports by IATA code: L)